Henri Louis Marie van Schaik (July 24, 1899 in Delft – August 19, 1991 in Cavendish, Vermont, United States) was a Dutch horse rider who competed in the 1936 Summer Olympics. In 1936, he and his horse Santa Bell won the silver medal as part of the Dutch show jumping team, after finishing 23rd in the individual jumping competition.

References

External links
profile

1899 births
1991 deaths
Dutch show jumping riders
Olympic equestrians of the Netherlands
Dutch male equestrians
Equestrians at the 1936 Summer Olympics
Olympic silver medalists for the Netherlands
Sportspeople from Delft
Olympic medalists in equestrian
Medalists at the 1936 Summer Olympics